Pico del Águila is a peak of the mountain range called Ajusco Volcano 3,937 mt, located in Cumbres del Ajusco National Park (other Volcanoes that form part of the same area are: Malinali, Mezontepec, Pelado, Oyameyo, Malacatepec, Couepil, Cictontle, Xitli (or Xitle, this last erupted at the southern outskirts of Mexico City), in the borough of Tlalpan. It is a popular Sunday hike, and can be climbed in about two hours.

References

Aguila
Tourist attractions in Mexico City
Landforms of Mexico City